Horscroft is a surname. Notable people with the surname include:

Alistair Horscroft, British author, speaker, television presenter, and entrepreneur
Grant Horscroft (born 1961), English footballer
Scott Horscroft (born 1977), Australian music producer and sound engineer

English-language surnames